Ceresfjellet is a mountain on Spitsbergen in Svalbard, Norway. It is located west of Wijdefjorden and is named for the dwarf planet Ceres.

References

Mountains of Spitsbergen